Maseeha, is a 2002 Indian action drama film written by Pradeep Ghatak and directed by Partho Ghosh. The film stars Sunil Shetty, Mohan Joshi, Rajpal Yadav and Namrata Shirodkar.

Plot
Krishna lives in Shantinagar, the town terrorized by Surajbhan who has close connection with police officers. Kishna is the victims of atrocities of Surajbhan. He vows to end his reign of terror.

Cast 
Suniel Shetty as Krishna a.k.a Dushman Jaan ka bhi maal ka bhi.
Namrata Shirodkar as Pinky, Krishna's sister and Shiva's love interest.
Inder Kumar as Shiva 
Manek Bedi as Vijay Srivastav 
Rajpal Yadav as Surajbhan's brother-in-law 
Shiva Rindani as Inspector Thapar 
Mohan Joshi as DCP Srivastav, Vijay's father 
Mukesh Rishi as Surajbhan 
Tiku Talsania as Pinky's father
Beena Banerjee as Janki, Shiva's mother 
Shama Deshpand as Parvati Srivastav
Raju Shrestha as Pinto
Viju Khote
Ishrat Ali as Prisoner in Srivastav's Jail
Gurbachan Singh as Surajbhan Henchman

Production
During the filming, Inder Kumar was bedridden for five years due to a broken vertebra from helicopter fall while doing his own stunt on the set of the film.

Soundtrack
Anand Raaj Anand composed the songs, while Dev Kohli wrote the songs.

References

External links
 

2002 films
2000s Hindi-language films
Indian action films
Films scored by Anand Raj Anand
Films scored by Sanjoy Chowdhury
Films directed by Partho Ghosh
2002 action films
2000s masala films